Tapner is a surname. Notable people with the surname include: 

John Tapner (1823–1854), English murderer 
Rory Tapner (born 1959), British businessman
Rosie Tapner (born 1995), English model and television presenter

See also
Tanner (surname)
Tapper (surname)